The Pencoyd Bridge was a former PRR industrial spur serving Pencoyd Iron Works and local industries from Schuylkill Branch. It is part of the Cynwyd Heritage Trail and connects Bala Cynwyd with Manayunk. The bridge was redeveloped and reopened in 2016 as a bicycle trail. The project was funded by the MLP Ventures.

References

See also
 
 
 
 
 List of crossings of the Schuylkill River

Bridges in Philadelphia
Bridges over the Schuylkill River
Transportation in Montgomery County, Pennsylvania
Transportation in Philadelphia
Northwest Philadelphia